Indarctos is an extinct genus of bear, endemic to North America, Europe and Asia during the Miocene.

The oldest member is from Arizona (~11.1—7.7 Ma) and youngest is (~9.0—5.3 Ma) from Kazakhstan. In North America this animal was contemporary with Plionarctos (~10.3—3.3 Ma).

Discovery, history and taxonomy

Discoveries 
A molar (designated to MNA 1839/km-83) discovered from the Karabulak formation in 1988 was tentatively assigned to Indarctos sp. In 2017 it was re examined and assigned to I. punjabensis. The tooth was found to belong to a young individual, which might possibly be a male, and is the largest tooth known from this species. This might be due to sexual dimorphism since extant male bears are larger than the females.

Species 
 
Indarctos is known from several species spread widely across Eurasia, North America, and North Africa, however, most of them are known from fragmentary remains which leaves us with insufficient knowledge of the anatomy, lifestyle, taxonomy and paleoecology of some species. These species are usually established based on poor remains, where the presence of sexual dimorphism, paleogeographical variation and individual variation is not taken into account, resulting in a number of species whose taxonomic validity is doubted.

The following are some species of this genus:

I. arctoides: This species had a herbivorous diet, and it was ancestral to the later I. punjabensis.

I. punjabiensis: This species is the geologically youngest and last species of Indarctos. It had a wide distribution 6.3–6.5 Ma during the Late Miocene, across Eurasia. It is known from the Karabulak formation of Kazakhstan, to China and the Dhon Pathan formation of Indo-Pakistan. It descended from the earlier I. arctoides, but unlike its ancestor, it was omnivorous and bigger in size. Based on resemblance of its forelimbs to those of the modern brown bear, it possibly had similar locomotor adaptations, evolutionary features such as this led to the migration of Indarctos-like bears into North America. At the end of the Late Miocene, Indarctos punjabiensis went extinct as the last species of its genus.

Distribution and paleoecology

Some sites and specimen ages:
Box T Site, Lipscomb County, Texas ~9.3—9.2 Ma.
Rattlesnake site, Grant County, Oregon ~10.3—4.9 Ma.
Withlacoochee River Site 4A, Marion County, Florida (Indarctos sp.) ~10.3—4.9 Ma.
Lufeng, Yunnan, China (I. atticus) ~9—5.3 Ma.
Yulafli (CY), Thrace, Turkey (I. arctoides) ~9.7—8.7 Ma.
Batallones-3, Madrid Basin, Spain (I. arctoides) ~11.6—5.3 Ma.

In Kazakhstan, the species I. punjabiensis is known from the Karabulak formation which dates to 6.3–6.5 Ma (Late Miocene). It coexisted with three mustelids (Martes sp., Promeles sp., Plesiogulo crassa Teilhard), three feliforms (Adcrocuta eximia, Hyaenictitherium hyaenoides orlovi, Amphimachairodus kurteni), four perissodactyls (Hipparion hippidiodus, H. elegans, Chilotherium sp., Sinotherium zaisanensis), and six artiodactyls (Cervavitus novorossiae, Procapreolus latifrons, Samotherium cf. irtyshense, Paleotragus (Yuorlovia) asiaticus, Tragoportax sp., Gazella dorcadoides). The climate that Indarctos punjabensis lived in was mild and arid. It was a habitat of wide, open steppes.

References

Miocene bears
Miocene mammals of North America
Miocene mammals of Asia
Miocene mammals of Africa
Prehistoric mammals of Europe
Prehistoric carnivoran genera
Articles containing video clips